Frank J. "Frankie" Vaughn (also spelled Vaughan) (February 18, 1902 – July 9, 1959) was a U.S. soccer goalkeeper and full back.  He spent his entire career in St. Louis with the Ben Millers, was on the U.S. roster for the 1930 FIFA World Cup and is a member of the National Soccer Hall of Fame.

Professional career
Vaughn was born in St. Louis, Missouri, and spent his professional career with Ben Millers in the St. Louis Soccer League during the 1920s and 1930s.  However, he is not listed on the team's roster for either its 1920 National Challenge Cup championship or when it finished as runner-up in the 1926 National Cup.  In 1920, he was part of a St. Louis All Star team which toured Scandinavia.

National team
In 1920, Vaughn was called into the U.S. national team for the 1930 FIFA World Cup.  While he did not play in any of the cup games, he did play in several exhibition matches during the U.S. team's tour of South America following its elimination.  These games were against club and regional, not national, teams so they do not count as full internationals.  As a result, Vaughn never officially played for the U.S.

Vaughn died in his home city of St. Louis.  He was inducted into the St. Louis Soccer Hall of Fame in 1972 and the National Soccer Hall of Fame in 1986.

References

External links
 National Soccer Hall of Fame profile

1902 births
1930 FIFA World Cup players
1959 deaths
American soccer players
St. Louis Soccer League players
St. Louis Ben Millers players
National Soccer Hall of Fame members
Soccer players from St. Louis
Association football defenders